His Majesty's Most Loyal Opposition, commonly known as the Official Opposition in the United Kingdom, is the main political opposition to His Majesty's Government. This is usually the political party with the second-largest number of seats in the House of Commons, as the largest party will usually form the government. Since May 2010, the Official Opposition has been the Labour Party, led by Sir Keir Starmer since 2020.

Origins
The phrase His Majesty's Opposition was coined in 1826, before the advent of the modern two-party system, when Parliament consisted more of interests, relationships and factions rather than the highly coherent political parties of today (although the Whigs and Tories were the two main parties). The phrase was originally coined in jest; in attacking Foreign Secretary George Canning in the House of Commons, John Hobhouse said jokingly, "It is said to be hard on His Majesty's Ministers to raise objections of this character but it is more hard on His Majesty's Opposition to compel them to take this course."

Opposition days
Whilst most days in the House of Commons are set aside for government business, twenty days in each session are set aside for opposition debates.  Of these days, seventeen are at the disposal of the Leader of the Opposition and three can be used by the leader of the smaller, or tertiary, opposition party (for most recent history this has been the Liberal Democrats, but since the 2015 General Election has been the Scottish National Party).

Although the Opposition has no more formal powers in setting the Parliamentary agenda, in reality they have a certain influence through a process known as the usual channels.

Leader of the Opposition

The Leader of His Majesty's Most Loyal Opposition is often seen as the Prime Minister-in-waiting. The Leader of the Opposition receives a statutory salary and perquisites like those of a cabinet minister, including appointment as a Privy Counsellor.  Since 1915, the Leader of the Opposition has, like the Prime Minister, always been a member of the House of Commons. Before that a member of the House of Lords sometimes took on the role, although often there was no overall Leader of the Opposition.

Although there has never been a dispute as to who holds the position, under the Ministerial and other Salaries Act 1975, the Speaker's decision on the identity of the Leader of the Opposition is final.

As of 19 October 2022, the current Leader of the Opposition is Keir Starmer who is also Leader of the Labour Party. He was elected on 2 April 2020 replacing Jeremy Corbyn who had been the leader since 2015.

Ministers' Questions

Prime Minister's Questions

The most public parliamentary function of the Leader of the Opposition is Prime Minister's Questions (PMQs), currently a 30-minute session held on Wednesday at noon when Parliament is sitting. The Leader of the Opposition has six questions, which they sometimes split into two sets. Backbench opposition MPs and frontbench opposition MPs that are not in the Shadow Cabinet also have the right to question the Prime Minister; they are selected either through a ballot, or by "catching the Speaker's eye". By convention, other Shadow Cabinet members do not question the Prime Minister at PMQs, except when standing in for the Leader.

Questions to other ministers
Every government department is subjected to questions in the House of Commons and the House of Lords. As with PMQs, the official opposition spokespersons are allocated a number of questions, and in addition backbench MPs are free to ask questions.  In the House of Lords, opposition spokespersons also question the government.  This is one of the reasons why every government department has at least one Member of Parliament and one peer in it.

Seating
As is usual with Westminster systems, and other statutory assemblies and councils in the UK, the government and its supporters sit to the Speaker's right, whilst the opposition parties sit to their left. Currently, members from the Conservative Party sit to the Speaker's right, and members from the Labour Party sit on the main left bench, which is where the main opposition party sits. The second main opposition bench is where the third largest party sits, in this case the Scottish National Party. The back of this bench is where other minor parties sit, such as the Liberal Democrats, the DUP, Plaid Cymru, SDLP, Alliance, the Greens and one Independent.

See also
 Leader of the Opposition (United Kingdom)
 List of British shadow cabinets
 Official Opposition frontbench
 Official Opposition Shadow Cabinet (United Kingdom)
 Parliamentary opposition
 SNP Frontbench Team

Notes

References